Wang Mingxia (born 21 July 1971) is a retired Chinese long-distance runner.

She finished 15th in the 10,000 metres at the 1996 Olympic Games, and at the 1997 East Asian Games she won a silver medal in the same event as well as a bronze medal in the 5000 metres.

Her personal best time was 31:12.58 minutes, achieved in 1997.

References

1971 births
Living people
Chinese female long-distance runners
Olympic athletes of China
Athletes (track and field) at the 1996 Summer Olympics